Barred yellow is used as a common name for:
 Cidaria fulvata, a moth in the family Geometridae found in Europe and Central Asia
 Eulithis propulsata, a moth in the family Geometridae found in North America
 Eurema daira, a butterfly in the family Pieridae found in Argentina north to the southern United States and occasionally other U.S. states

Animal common name disambiguation pages